Larry W. Esposito (born April 15, 1951) is an American planetary astronomer and a professor at the Laboratory for Atmospheric and Space Physics, University of Colorado Boulder. A 1973 graduate at the Massachusetts Institute of Technology, Esposito received his Ph.D. in astronomy at the University of Massachusetts Amherst. In 1985, he was awarded the H. C. Urey Prize by the American Astronomical Society. He was also awarded The NASA Medal for Exceptional Scientific Achievement, and the Richtmeyer Lecture Award from the American Association of Physics Teachers and the American Physical Society. His current work involves planetary atmospheres and ring systems.

Esposito was the principal investigator for the Ultra-Violet Imaging Spectrograph aboard the NASA Cassini-Huygens unmanned mission to the Saturn system.

References

American astronomers
Planetary scientists
1951 births
Living people
University of Colorado faculty
University of Massachusetts Amherst alumni